Afzal ul-Mulk (1 January 1867 – 6 November 1892) was the Mehtar (ruler) of the princely state of Chitral who briefly ruled following the death of his father the Mehtar Aman ul-Mulk, usurping the right of his elder brother Nizam ul-Mulk. His reign lasted two months and seven days before he was murdered by his uncle Sher Afzal.

References 

Mehtars of Chitral
Princely states of India
1867 births
1892 deaths
Princely rulers of Pakistan
Nawabs of Pakistan